Garakan Rural District is a rural district (dehestan) in the Central District of Ashtian County, Markazi Province, Iran. At the 2006 census, its population was 4,224, in 1,134 families. The rural district has 12 villages.

References 

Rural Districts of Markazi Province
Ashtian County